The 1957–58 Georgetown Hoyas men's basketball team represented Georgetown University during the 1957–58 NCAA University Division college basketball season. Tom Nolan coached them in his second season as head coach. The team was an independent and played its home games at McDonough Gymnasium on the Georgetown campus in Washington, D.C. It finished with a record of 10-11 and had no post-season play.

Season recap

Sophomore forward Tom McCloskey had been the Washington, D.C., high school all-city Most Valuable Player before arriving at Georgetown in the fall of 1956 for a season on the freshman team. He joined the varsity team this season. He scored a career-high 24 points against Loyola of Maryland in the season opener, and by the middle of January 1958 he had scored in double figures in six of the team's seven games. McCloskey and junior forward Jack Nies were averaging a combined 22 points per game by February.

McCloskey's and Nies's season came to a sudden end when they were among four players Georgetown placed on academic suspension for the rest of the season even though they remained academically eligible under National Collegiate Athletic Association (NCAA) standards. McCloskey's abbreviated season ended with him averaging 12.4 points and 7.6 rebounds per game.

Senior forward Ken Pichette carried the weight as the team's main scorer after the departure of McCloskey and Nies, averaging 19 points per game after they were suspended, not counting 31 points he scored in the mid-February exhibition game against the New York Athletic Club. However, the suspensions crippled the team, and it lost six of its last eight games and eight of its last ten to finish with a record of 10–11. It was not ranked in the Top 20 in the Associated Press Poll or Coaches' Poll at any time.

Roster
Sources

Sophomore guard Ed Hargaden Jr., joined the team this year as the first second-generation Georgetown men's basketball player, his father, guard Ed Hargaden, having been a standout guard on the 1932–33, 1933–34, and 1934–35 teams. He also was the only second-generation player in school history until center Patrick Ewing's son, forward Patrick Ewing Jr., joined the team in the 2006-07 season.

Sophomore forward Henry Rojas left the team during the season, and sophomore guard Jim Brown joined the team to replace him. They both wore No. 21.

1957–58 schedule and results

Sources

Note

|-
!colspan=9 style="background:#002147; color:#8D817B;"| Regular Season

Notes

References

Georgetown Hoyas men's basketball seasons
Georgetown
Georgetown Hoyas men's basketball team
Georgetown Hoyas men's basketball team